Hortus semper virens is a botanical reference book by Johann Simon von Kerner, from 1827.

Description
The page size is 65.5 x 49 centimeters. It is in the collection of the Universitäts- und Landesbibliothek Darmstadt.

Analysis
It is a set of twelve prints with latin description.

References

External links
Hortus semper virens: exhibens icones plantarum selectiorum, Universitäts- und Landesbibliothek Darmstadt

Botany books